Wasan is a [[Khatri]] clan found in the Punjabi [[Hindus|Hindu]] and [[Sikhs|Sikh]] communities.Wasan is a Punjabi last name and surname . The Khatris (Punjabi) or Kshatriyas (Sanskrit, (K) silent) are a north Indian community that originated in the Potwar Plateau of Punjab. This region is historically connected with the composition of the Vedas and classics like the Mahabharata and Ashtadhyayi. In the old varna (caste) system the Kshatriya were members of the Hindu military order who as administrators and rulers, were tasked with protecting Hindu Dharma, and serving humanity. In the course of time, however, as a result of economic and political exigencies, Khatris also expanded into mercantile occupations.It is important to note that many of the Khatri clans (gotras) are common with many jatt castes.

References 

 References
 Sudhir Kakar (30 October 2014). A Book of Memory: Confessions and Reflections (2014 ed.). Penguin UK. ISBN9789351188858.
 Patrick Hanks (8 May 2003). Dictionary of American Family Names (2003 ed.). Oxford University Press. p. 275. ISBN 978-0-19977-169-1. Retrieved 14 April 2018.

Indian surnames
Punjabi-language surnames
Surnames of Indian origin
Hindu surnames
Khatri clans
Khatri surnames